The Strange Woman (Spanish: Una extraña mujer) is a 1947 Mexican drama film directed by Miguel M. Delgado and starring Roberto Silva, Alicia Barrié, and Andrés Soler. It was written by Luis Alcoriza.

Plot summary

Cast
 Roberto Silva		
 Alicia Barrié		
 Andrés Soler	
 Inés Edmonson	
 Consuelo Guerrero de Luna
 Agustín Isunza
 Beatriz Alatorre
 Rafael Alcayde
 José Morcillo

References

External links
 

1947 films
1940s Spanish-language films
Mexican black-and-white films
Mexican drama films
1947 drama films
Films directed by Miguel M. Delgado
1940s Mexican films